Notre-Dame-de-la-Mer is a commune in the Yvelines department in the Île-de-France region in north-central France. It was established on 1 January 2019 by merger of the former communes of Jeufosse (the seat) and Port-Villez.

See also
Communes of the Yvelines department

References

Communes of Yvelines
2019 establishments in France
Populated places established in 2019
Veliocasses